Balta (Old Norse: "Baltey") is an uninhabited island in Shetland, Scotland.

Geography
Balta lies off the east coast of Unst and Balta Sound.

There is a natural arch on the eastern side of the island.

Balta Island Seafare and Skaw Smolts are the most northerly fish farm and fish hatchery in Britain.

History
Historic remains on the island include the ruins of a broch and of a Norse chapel dedicated to Saint Sunniva. There are no census records of more recent inhabitation.

John MacCulloch visited Balta in May 1820 to carry out the Trigonometrical Survey for the Ordnance Survey. Balta was the northernmost station of the zenith sector.

Lighthouse
The Balta Light, at the southern tip of the island was one of the first concrete structures in Shetland. The lighthouse was designed by David Stevenson and built in 1895. It was demolished in 2003 and replaced by a small solar-powered light.

See also

 List of lighthouses in Scotland
 List of Northern Lighthouse Board lighthouses

Footnotes

External links
 Northern Lighthouse Board 

Sites of Special Scientific Interest in Shetland
Uninhabited islands of Shetland
Former populated places in Scotland
Natural arches of Scotland